The German strike of January 1918 was a strike against World War I which spread across the German Empire. It lasted from 25 January to 1 February 1918. It is known as the "Januarstreik", as distinct from the "Jännerstreik" which preceded it spreading across Austria-Hungary between January 3 and 25, 1918. The strike began in Berlin on 28 January and spread across the rest of Germany, but finally collapsed. The strike was caused by food shortages, war weariness and the October Revolution in Russia, which raised the hopes of revolutionary Marxists in Germany.

Berlin
400,000 workers went on strike primarily in the munitions and metal plants.

References

1918 labor disputes and strikes
1918 in Germany
Politics of World War I
January 1918 events